Aldeno is a comune in Trentino in north Italy.

References

External links
Homepage of the city

Cities and towns in Trentino-Alto Adige/Südtirol